Arthur Francis Benjamin Guinness, 3rd Earl of Iveagh (20 May 1937 – 18 June 1992), styled Viscount Elveden between 1945 and 1967, was an Irish businessman and politician. He was chairman of Guinness plc from 1962 to 1986, and then its president from 1986 until his death in 1992.

Biography
Lord Iveagh (often popularly known as Benjamin Iveagh) was born into the Anglo-Irish Guinness family, being the son of Arthur Onslow Edward Guinness, Viscount Elveden, and Lady Elizabeth Cecilia Hare, daughter of the Richard Hare, 4th Earl of Listowel. His father, Viscount Elveden, was a Major in the 55th (Suffolk and Norfolk Yeomanry) Anti-Tank Regiment of the Royal Artillery and was killed in action by a V-2 rocket while serving in Belgium on 8 February 1945. In 1947, his mother remarried Edward Rory More O'Ferrall, from another aristocratic Irish family.

Lord Iveagh was educated at Eton College, Trinity College, Cambridge, and the University of Grenoble. He inherited the title from his grandfather, The 2nd Earl of Iveagh, in September 1967. He lived at Farmleigh in the Phoenix Park in Dublin and was chairman of Guinness 1961–1992. He was a trustee of two charitable housing associations, the Iveagh Trust in Dublin and the Guinness Trust in London. He was involved in horse breeding and also owned horses. The More O'Ferralls, his mother's husband's family were prominent in racing and breeding circles. He helped to finance the Kildangan Stud, a famous stud farm owned by his step-uncle, Roderic More O'Ferrall.

Uniquely at the time, he was a member of two upper houses simultaneously. He was in the British House of Lords from 1967 to 1992, and was appointed an Irish Senator by Liam Cosgrave from 1973 to 1977.

Towards the end of his life, Guinness was an alcoholic.

His obituary in The Independent, described his business career as "at best undistinguished and at times positively disastrous ...[h]is reign [as chairman of Guinness] was marked first by a phase of unbridled diversification away from the core brewing business and then a prolonged period of debilitating decline."

Personal life and family
Lord Iveagh married Miranda Daphne Jane Smiley, daughter of Major Michael Smiley, of Castle Fraser, Kemnay, Aberdeenshire, on 12 March 1963. They had four children before their divorce in 1984:

Lady Emma Lavinia (born 7 December 1963)
Lady Louisa Jane (born 20 February 1967)
Edward Guinness, 4th Earl of Iveagh (born 25 August 1969)
Hon. Rory Michael Benjamin Guinness (born 12 December 1974)

Lord Iveagh died of cancer in Kensington and Chelsea, London, in 1992 at the age of 55. His eldest son succeeded to the family titles.

Arms

References

External links 
 

1937 births
1992 deaths
20th-century Anglo-Irish people
Alumni of Trinity College, Cambridge
Deaths from cancer in England
Earls of Iveagh
Benjamin Guinness, 3rd Earl of Iveagh
Irish Anglicans
Irish art collectors
Guinness, Benjamin
Members of the 13th Seanad
People educated at Eton College
Grenoble Alpes University alumni
Nominated members of Seanad Éireann
Fine Gael senators
Deaths from throat cancer